Adrian Martinez (born January 20, 1972, in New York City) is an American actor and comedian, known for The Secret Life of Walter Mitty and Focus. He also worked in the theatre. He is also known for his role as the "Discount Double Check" guy in a series of State Farm commercials starring Aaron Rodgers.

Career 
Martinez debuted his acting career with the series America's Most Wanted in 1993, and since then he has acted in several television series. He has also worked in the theater, and a member of LAByrinth Theater Company.

In 2009, Martinez appeared in Grand Theft Auto IV: The Lost and Damned as Brian Jeremy, the secondary antagonist, Set in 2008, Johnny Klebitz in The Angels of Death and The Lost MC Brotherhoods.

In 2010, Martinez starred in the action comedy Cop Out as Tino, along with Bruce Willis and Tracy Morgan, directed by Kevin Smith, released on February 26, 2010, by Warner Bros. Pictures. He portrayed the role of Ginger Goon in the superhero comedy film Kick-Ass which starred Aaron Taylor-Johnson, Mark Strong, and Chloë Grace Moretz, directed by Matthew Vaughn and released on April 16, 2010.

In 2012, Martinez starred in Spanish-language comedy Casa de Mi Padre as Manuel along with Will Ferrell, Gael García Bernal, and Diego Luna. The film was directed by Matt Piedmont and was released on March 16, 2012.

In 2013, Martinez appeared in the biographical comedy film The Secret Life of Walter Mitty as Hernando for a supporting role along with Ben Stiller and Kristen Wiig in the lead. Stiller directed the film based on the script by Steve Conrad, which released in North America by 20th Century Fox on December 25, 2013. Later he also starred in the film American Hustle as Julius along with Christian Bale, Bradley Cooper, Jeremy Renner, Amy Adams, and Jennifer Lawrence. David O. Russell directed the film based on his own script co-written by Eric Warren Singer, and the film was released on December 13, 2013, by Columbia Pictures.

In 2014, Martinez appeared in the superhero film The Amazing Spider-Man 2 as Bodega Cashier, opposite Andrew Garfield and Emma Stone, directed by Marc Webb and released on May 2, 2014.

In 2015, Martinez played a prominent role of Farhad in the heist comedy Focus along with Will Smith and Margot Robbie, directed by Glenn Ficarra and John Requa based on their own script. The film was released on February 27, 2015, by Warner Bros. Focus was his first main role in the career of 20 years, on which Martinez felt like he had "been running in a marathon for 20 years and somebody from the side just reached out and handed [him] a cup of Champagne." He also appeared in the comedy film Sisters, along with Tina Fey and Amy Poehler, which was released on December 18, 2015.

In June 2015, Martinez was cast in an action comedy starring Bruce Willis to play the owner of a local pizza joint. The movie - working title Going Under - was directed by Mark Cullen and Robb Cullen. It was released on video-on-demand to poor reviews as Once Upon a Time in Venice (also known as LA Vengeance in the UK) in 2017.

He joined the main cast on the ABC TV series Stumptown (2019) as "Tookie", a food truck owner who serves as an informant for the main character, played by Cobie Smulders.

Filmography

Film

Television

Video games

References

External links 
 

Living people
American male film actors
American male comedians
American male television actors
American male voice actors
Male actors from New York City
American male actors of Mexican descent
American male stage actors
American stand-up comedians
20th-century American male actors
21st-century American male actors
Comedians from New York City
20th-century American comedians
21st-century American comedians
1972 births